Sant'Angelo Muxaro (or) is a comune (municipality) in the Province of Agrigento in the Italian region Sicily, located about  south of Palermo and about  north of Agrigento. The town was founded and historically inhabited by the Arbëreshë community.

History
Four gold and silver bowls dating from 650 to 600 BC were found in a tomb in the vicinity of the village in the 18th century. Only one gold bowl remains, now in the British Museum's collection. The BM's phiale is decorated with 6 striding bulls and has become a symbol of Sant'Angelo Muxaro.

Following the Ottoman invasion of Albania in the late fifteenth century, the present town was colonized by Albanian refugees. The centre of the town was founded in 1506 with further building in 1511. The town retained a distinct Italo-Albanian or Arbëreshë culture for many years. In the early 17th century the town was still an Arbëreshë settlement but now the Arbëresh language has disappeared from usage.

In 1600, the barony was acquired by the Princes of Castelvetrano, D'Aragona and Tagliavia and finally came under the jurisdiction of Pignatelli, Dukes of Monteleone, who kept it until 1812, when feudalism was suppressed in Sicily.

Geography
Sant'Angelo Muxaro borders the following municipalities: Agrigento, Alessandria della Rocca, Aragona, Casteltermini, Cattolica Eraclea, Cianciana, Raffadali, San Biagio Platani, Santa Elisabetta.

References

External links
 Official website

 

Arbëresh settlements
Cities and towns in Sicily
Populated places established in 1506